Saint Severin of Cologne was the third Bishop of Cologne, living in the later 4th century.

Life
Severin is said in 376 to have founded a monastery in the then Colonia Agrippina in honour of the martyrs Saints Cornelius and Cyprian, from which developed the later Basilica of St. Severin. Severin is notable as a prominent opponent of Arianism.

According to legend, Severinus was taking a walk in a field while still a priest when he heard a voice tell him he would one day be bishop of Cologne. When he asked when that would happen, he was told when his staff buds and flowers. Immediately, he stuck his staff into the ground, it budded and he was called to Cologne.

Veneration
Severin was highly venerated in Cologne early on. His bones are today preserved in a gold shrine in the choir of St Severin's Church in Cologne. That seen today is a reconstruction of 1819, as the medieval shrine was melted down for the gold in the period of French rule, c. 1795–98.  Its opening in 1999 corroborated the documented transfer of the bones of bishop Wigfried of Cologne (924–953), as it was possible to date the old inner wooden shrine by the latest dendrochronological techniques to the year 948. An ancient cloth, probably Byzantine, was also discovered, with which the wooden box was lined. The saint's feast day is 23 October.

As a name

The Scandinavian name "Søren" is derived from Saint Severin.

See also
 Severinus of Bordeaux

References

External links

 The wooden shrine of Saint Severin

403 deaths
Roman Catholic bishops of Cologne
4th-century bishops in Germania
Saints of Germania
4th-century Christian saints
Year of birth unknown